Óttarr Olaf Proppé (born 7 November 1968) is a former Icelandic politician. He is a musician, actor, former Reykjavík City Councilor (Best Party 2010-2014) and former Member of Parliament (Bright Future 2013-2017). Óttarr was elected chairman of the party in 2015. He was a member of the rock band HAM in the years 1988–1994, as well as being the lead singer of the rock-cabaret band Dr. Spock. He also starred in several movies, including Sódóma Reykjavík from 1992, and Nói Albinói and Angels of the Universe from 2000. He made a guest appearance with the band Pollapönk during the Eurovision Song Contest 2014 in Denmark, singing "No Prejudice" ending up 8th in the semi final with 61, resulting in them progressing to the final finishing in 15th with 58 points, being Iceland's best result since 2009.

References 

1968 births
Ottarr Proppe
Living people
Ottarr Proppe
Ottarr Proppe
Ottarr Proppe
Ottarr Proppe
Ottarr Proppe
Ottarr Proppe
Government ministers of Iceland
Ottarr Proppe